The North Fork Breitenbush River is a tributary of the Breitenbush River in the U.S. state of Oregon. It begins at Papoose Lakes near Breitenbush Lake in the Cascade Range north of Mount Jefferson and flows generally northwest and west through the Mount Hood National Forest, Olallie Scenic Area, Mount Jefferson Wilderness, and Willamette National Forest. It merges with the South Fork Breitenbush River to form the Breitenbush River main stem slightly upstream of Breitenbush Hot Springs.

The three named tributaries of the North Fork Breitenbush River from source to mouth are the South Fork North Fork Breitenbush River, Mink Creek, and Rapidan Creek.

See also
 List of rivers of Oregon

References

Rivers of Marion County, Oregon
Rivers of Oregon